Muir of Ord is a village in Easter Ross, in the Highland council area of Scotland. The Scottish geologist Sir Roderick Murchison was born in the village in 1792.

In September 2022, the village came to media attention when a local fish and chip shop owner uploaded a Facebook video celebrating the death of Queen Elizabeth II with a bottle of champagne. The owner was then chased away from the village by angry locals who vandalized the chip shop with eggs and tomato ketchup.

History
Named Tarradale until 1862, historically access to the village was limited by the natural obstacles of the River Beauly and the River Conon. This changed in 1814 with the construction of the Conon Bridge. Cattle drivers used the new routes to transport livestock and markets were set up in 1820 close to where the village now lies. The village grew extensively in the 19th century due to the establishment of the distillery and goods industries.

Castle Hill Henge
Today it is situated on the green of the Muir of Ord golf course.

Amenities

Just outside of the centre of the village is the Glen Ord Distillery, one of the few remaining whisky distilleries on the Black Isle.  The Black Isle Show, one of the largest agricultural shows in Scotland, is held every August in a showground near Muir of Ord. The showground is a popular exhibition site thanks to the surrounding flower fields.

Muir of Ord used to have a local football team in the 2000s, Muir of Ord Rovers F.C., that competed in the North Caledonian Football League.

The Muir Hub is the newest community building in Muir of Ord. Originally belonging to Tarradale primary school the building had been left unused for numerous years before being refurbished in January 2017. It is now a charity funded venue situated in the heart of the village. The building is multi-functional serving as a cafe, small cinema, conference space and social space. Many local groups meet here and rooms can be rented out for events, clubs, meetings, etc.

Transport
The major route of the A9 road passed through the village until 1982, when it was bypassed by the Kessock Bridge.

References

External links
The Muir of Ord community website

Populated places on the Black Isle